The Copa América is South America's major tournament in senior men's soccer and determines the continental champion. Until 1967, the tournament was known as South American Championship. It is the oldest continental championship in the world.

Jamaica are not members of the South American football confederation CONMEBOL. But because CONMEBOL only has ten member associations, guest nations have regularly been invited since 1993.

Record at the Copa América
Jamaica was invited to the Copa América for the first time in 2015, finishing last among Argentina, Uruguay, and Paraguay. The following year, the team competed in the Copa América Centenario as winners of the 2014 Caribbean Cup, again finishing last in the group stage.

2015 Copa América

Copa América Centenario

References

External links
RSSSF archives and results
Soccerway database

Countries at the Copa América
Copa america